Dipankar Gupta (born 11 October 1949) is an Indian sociologist and public intellectual. 
He was formerly Professor in the Centre for the Study of Social Systems, Jawaharlal Nehru University, New Delhi. For a brief period from 1993 to 1994, he was also associated with the Delhi School of Economics as Professor in the Department of Sociology. His current research interests include rural-urban transformation, labour laws in the informal sector, modernity, ethnicity, caste and stratification. He writes frequently forThe Times of India, and occasionally for The Hindu  The Indian Express and Anandbazar Patrika. He served on the board of institutions like the Reserve Bank of India, the National Bank for Agricultural and Rural Development (NABARD) and Max India.

Early life and education 
Gupta was born and raised  in Delhi, Mumbai and Kanpur. He completed his MA in Sociology from the University of Delhi in 1971, before doing his PhD from Jawaharlal Nehru University in 1977.

Career 
Gupta has had a diverse career in academics, the corporate world and in government agencies. Between 1980 and 2009 Gupta was a professor at the Jawaharlal Nehru University's Centre for the Study of Social Systems. Between 1990 and 2007 he was co-editor of Contributions to Indian Sociology

He started and led KPMG's Business Ethics and Integrity Division, New Delhi; was a member of the National Security Advisory Board and the News Broadcasting Standards Authority. In 2010, he served on the Social Sciences jury for the Infosys Prize.
He has also been on the Board of Governors of the Doon School.

Awards 
 2013 D.Litt. Honoris Causa, University of Burdwan, West Bengal
 2010 Chevalier D'Ordre Des Arts et Des Lettres, (Knight of the Order of Arts and Letters) French Government Award 
 2004 Malcolm Adeseshiah Award

Bibliography 
 Gupta, Dipankar (2022) Checkpoint Sociology: A Cultural Reading of Policies and Politics, Delhi: Aakar Books
 Gupta, Dipankar (2018) Talking Sociology (Conversations with Ramin Jahanbegloo), New Delhi: Oxford University Press
 Gupta, Dipankar (2017) From 'People' to 'Citizens': Democracy's Must take Road, Social Science Press. .
 Gupta, Dipankar (2017) QED: India Tests Social Theory, 2017, Oxford University Press.

References 

Indian sociologists
Delhi University alumni
1949 births
Living people